The Jeju Black or Cheju Black is a Korean breed of domestic cattle. It is found only on the island of Jeju. It is one of four indigenous cattle breeds found in the Republic of Korea, the others being the Hanwoo, the Chikso and the Heugu.

History 

The first historic painting of Jeju Black Cattle was found on a mural of an ancient tomb named Anak Tomb No. 3 during the Goguryeo Dynasty in 357 AD. There also exist ancient documents, the Annals of the Joseon Dynasty and several others that described the shapes of cattle breeds. History of breeding of Jeju Black Cattle in Jeju Island dated back to 1702 AD, during the 28th year reign of King Sookjong. The administrator of Jeju-mok regional office at that period, known as Yi Hyeong-sang, surveyed around whole island, and those records were collected in Tamna Sullyeokdo. According to his report,  a total of 703 black cattle were raised at that time in the island. Also, recent scientific evidence (based on DNA analysis of bones recovered from Gonae-ri and Gwakji-ri in Aewaleup, Jeju City) was provided by a professor in Jeju National University (Oh et al., 2005) that ancestors of the present Jeju Black Cattle had been raised by humans since prehistory.

However, Jeju Black Cattle became endangered especially during the Japanese colonial period in 1920s. Most of the Jeju Black Cattles were forcefully dispossessed and shipped to Japan. Since 1992, scientists in Jeju Stockbreeding Promotion Institute have collected Jeju Black Cattle which were scattered at private farms in Jeju Island and managed as a group of genetic resource. They are also carrying out preservation/proliferation projects. As per their project goals expectations, if successful, over 600 of these black cattle will exist in Jeju area in near future. Jeju SPI also developed a breed discrimination tool using genetic markers. This tool has been applied to retain the uniqueness of the Jeju Black Cattle breed. In 2013, Republic of Korean government acknowledged the historical and cultural values of Jeju Black Cattle and assigned it Natural Monument No. 546 of National Cultural Property to prevent extinction and preserve the breed. The Korea Animal Improvement Association, which mainly functions for management of individual identification and pedigree information of seedstock animal owned either by institutions or private breeders, also manages breeding herd information of Jeju Black Cattle in their registration database system, which is open to public.

Characteristics 

The coat is black; there are also yellow cattle on the island.

References

Further reading 

 Kim, Hwan-kyeong (1964). “A Study on the Distribution of Coat Colors of Jeju’s Native Cattle”. The 2nd Collection of Treaties, Dong-A University.
 Park, Yeong-il (1971). “A Study on the Frequency of Coat Colors of Jeju’s Native Cattle”. Vol.13, Korea Stockbreeding Academy.
 Park, Yeong-il (1972). “Relationships between the Coat Colors and the Measured Body Lengths of Jeju’s Native Cattle”. Vol. 14, Korea Stockbreeding Academy.
 Yang, Yeong-hoon (2000). The Measurement System of Han-u and Measurement Condition of Jeju Black Cattle: Research Institute for Animal Science, Jeju National University.
 Kim, Kyu-il (2003). Phylogenic Relationships of Northeast Asian Cattle to Other Cattle Populations Determined Using Mitochondrial DNA D-Loop Sequence Polymorphism: Springer. Vol. 41(3) Numbers 3-491-980006-2928 SCIE.
 Kim, Jae-hwan (2005). Molecular Genetic Analysis of Ancient Cattle Bones Excavated from Archaeological Sites in Jeju, Korea: Korea Society for Molecular and Cellular Biology. Vol. 20(3) 1016-8478 KCI.
 Yoon, Doo-hak (2007). Allele Frequency of the Bovine Y-chromosomal Microsatellite Locus in the Cattle Breeds: Korean Society for Animal Science and Technology. Vol. 49(4) 1598-9429 KCI.
 Choi, Tae-jeong (2009). Establishment of Phylogenomic Characteristics for Korean Traditional Cattle Breeds (Hanwoo, Korean Brindle and Black): Jeonbuk National University.
 Yi, Seong-soo (2009). Relation of Expression Levels of Melanin Synthesis Genes According to the MC1R Genotypes with the Coat Color Patterns in Hanwoo, Jeju Black Cattle and Holstein: Korean Society of Life Science. Vol. 19(3).
 Han, Sang-hyeon (2010). Verification of ET and AI Derived Offspring Using on the Genetic Polymorphisms of Microsatellite and Coat Color Related Genes in Jeju Black Cattle: Korean Society of Life Science. Vol. 20(3).
 Han, Sang-hyeon (2011). Coat Color Patterns and Genotypes of Extension and Agoutiin Hanwoo and Jeju Black Cattle: Korean Society of Life Science. Vol. 21(4).

Cattle breeds originating in Korea
Jeju Province